Reuben's Restaurant and Delicatessen was a restaurant and Jewish deli in Manhattan, New York City founded by Arnold Reuben.

History

Arnold Reuben was a Jewish-German immigrant who founded Reuben's Restaurant in 1908 at 802 Park Avenue. In 1916 the restaurant moved to Broadway on 73rd Street before moving again two years later to 622 Madison Avenue. Thirty years after it first opened its doors, Reuben's Restaurant and Delicatessen finally had a formal opening at 6 East 58th Street with the mayor at the time, Fiorello La Guardia, in attendance. Reuben's remained in that location until the restaurant was sold in the mid-1960s, when it moved to 38th Street and Madison Avenue. It operated at 244 Madison Avenue until 2001 when the restaurant was forced to close due to health code infractions.

Reuben's Restaurant and Delicatessen played a small part in the 1919 Black Sox scandal when the Chicago White Sox conspired to "throw" the World Series in the most widely condemned instance of illegal high stakes gambling in sports history. Abe "The Little Champ" Attell's initial attempt to sell the idea to Arnold Rothstein, the most powerful sports gambler at the time, took place in a private room inside Reuben's.

Reuben would name sandwiches after celebrities, including Dean Martin and Frank Sinatra, a gimmick used by many restaurants at the time. In 1938, Reuben was interviewed about his restaurant by the Federal Writers' Project. Arnold Reuben's son, Arnold Reuben Jr., worked in the restaurant with his father until the mid-1960s when Reuben sold the restaurant to Harry L. Gilman. Marian Burros wrote about the restaurant's appearance on January 11, 1986, in The New York Times. She said: "Italian marble, gold-leaf ceiling, lots of walnut paneling and dark red leather seats — to a small-town girl, it was the quintessential New York restaurant."

See also
 List of delicatessens

References

Further reading
Reuben and his Restaurant, Library of Congress

External links
American Food Folklore
The Reuben Sandwich
History of Reuben Sandwich

1908 establishments in New York City
2001 disestablishments in New York (state)
 Defunct restaurants in New York City
 German-Jewish culture in New York City
Jewish delicatessens in the United States
 Jews and Judaism in Manhattan
 Restaurants established in 1908
 Restaurants disestablished in 2001
Defunct Jewish delicatessens